Margarete Oppenheim (born Margarete Eisner on October 10, 1857 in Leipzig; died September 2, 1935 in Berlin) was a German art collector and patron. She was among the first personalities to collect works of modern art in Germany and owned one of the largest collection in Germany.

Early life 
Margarete Eisner was born in Leipzig into a Jewish family in 1857, the daughter of Isidor Isaak Eisner and his wife Alwine (Lea), née Schlesinger. She was the second youngest of six children. Her father was a co-founder of the Leipzig company Callmann & Eisner, which traded in German and English manufactured goods. The family moved to Berlin in 1876.

First marriage and children 
In the same year, Margarete Eisner married Georg Reichenheim, a chemist with a doctorate, whose family owned textile factories in Silesia.  Margarete Reichenheim converted from Judaism to Christianity around the time of their wedding. The couple moved into an apartment at Viktoriastraße No. 26 in Berlin's upscale Tiergarten district. In 1877 their daughter Charlotte was born, and in 1879 their son Hans was born. The son died in 1900 as a student in Munich. In 1902 the daughter married the banker Paul von Mendelssohn-Bartholdy, from whom she divorced in 1927. She then married Georg Graf von Wesdehlen. The family circle also included the entrepreneur, art collector and patron James Simon, who had married Georg Reichenheim's sister Agnes in 1878.

Georg Reichenheim collected art. After his death in 1903, Margarete Reichenheim continued to add to the collection, including many modern paintings before it was fashionable. Historian Felix Gilbert noted in this regard that "they thought she was crazy in the family" to buy "so many of these awful modern paintings."

Second marriage 
In 1906 Margarete Reichenheim remarried, with chemist Franz Oppenheim, who worked as general manager for the Agfa company. Franz Oppenheim was also widowed; his two children, already grown up, were the chemist Kurt Oppenheim and Martha Oppenheim, who was married to the entrepreneur and later diplomat Ernst von Simson. After the wedding, Franz Oppenheim moved - unusually for the time - into his wife's apartment on Viktoriastrasse.  In 1913, Franz Oppenheim acquired the property at Corneliusstrasse No. 7, also located in the Tiergarten district, as a joint city residence.

The town house built there according to plans by the architect Hugo Wach was designed to meet the needs of the collector Margarete Oppenheim with gallery space and special wall display cases. In addition, the couple had a summer residence built in the Alsen villa colony in Berlin-Wannsee. For this purpose, three contiguous plots of land were purchased, on which the Oppenheim country house was built according to plans by the architect Alfred Messel. The villa had its own gallery wing for Margarete Oppenheim's collection. Even though Franz Oppenheim supported his wife in building up the art collection, he made it clear in a letter to Wilhelm Bode what division of responsibilities he saw in the Oppenheim household: "I am responsible for the management of the factory, the art department is under my wife.“ A fountain with penguin figures by the sculptor August Gaul was installed in the extensive garden of the country house. The garden architect Willy Lange laid out a rose garden for the rose grower Margarete Oppenheim. Among the neighbors at Wannsee was the painter Max Liebermann, a friend, who portrayed Margarete Oppenheim in various drawings in 1917 and painted various views of the garden. Another neighbor at Wannsee was the surgeon Ferdinand Sauerbruch.

Franz Oppenheim went with Margarete on a study trip to Egypt in 1929 where he died.

Philanthropy 
Starting in 1906, Margarete Oppenheim was a member of the Kaiser Friedrich Museumsverein, the sponsoring association of the museum headed by Wilhelm von Bode (today the Bodemuseum). In 1905 she donated the sculpture Hercules with the Lion to the department of Christian sculptures in the Kaiser Friedrich Museum and in 1913 a bust of King Henry IV of France. After World War I, the Berlin Museum of Decorative Arts received three pieces from her collection. She gave further objects to the Museum of Decorative Arts as a permanent loan for exhibition in the Berlin Palace. Together with the banker Robert von Mendelssohn, she donated the painting The Garden Bench by Max Liebermann to the National Gallery in 1917 on the occasion of the artist's 70th birthday. Oppenheim, also owned a large collection of Chinese arts and crafts and was a member of the German Society for East Asian Art.

Nazi era 
When the Nazis came to power in Germany in 1933,  the Oppenheim family was persecuted because of their Jewish heritage. Margarete resigned all honorary memberships and died in Berlin in 1935. The Villa Oppenheim, Am Grossen Wannsee 43-45, which had been inherited by te two children of Franz from his first marriage to Elsa Wohlheim, Kurt and Martha, was seized by the Nazi Sicherheitsdienst in 1937 and by the Gestapo in 1942.  Her art collection was auctioned in the spring of 1936 at the Munich art dealer Julius Böhler, with unsold lots sold at end of 1936 at the Munich auction house Adolf Weinmüller. 

Her Charlotte and Franz Oppenheim's two children emigrated to Switzerland. Hitler's Third Reich declared part of the collection to be valuable cultural assets, and outlawed their exportation. The Oppenheim property that remained in Germany was later confiscated by the German authorities, and the villa on Wannsee served for a time as the Wannsee Institute of the Reich Security Main Office. 

In memory of Franz and Margarete Oppenheim, a Berlin commemorative plaque was affixed to their former residence Zum Heckeshorn No. 38 in 2016.t.

Art Collection

Decorative arts and small sculptures 

The catalog for the 1936 auction was prepared by art historians from the Berlin Schlossmuseum, where the most valuable pieces of the collection from the fields of arts and crafts and sculpture had previously been on loan for about 15 years. The authors included Ludwig Schnorr von Carolsfeld, Martin Klar, Erich Meyer, Ernst Günter Troche, Erich Köllmann, Theodor Falkenberg, Robert Schmidt, Leopold Reidemeister and Otto von Falke. 

The collection included small sculptures made of wood and ivory, among them were Christian sculptures such as a statuette of the Virgin Mary in the style of Tilman Riemenschneider. In addition, there was a group of bronze statuettes dating back to Roman and ancient Egyptian pieces. However, the collection also included Venetian Renaissance bronzes and northern Italian inkwells. The bronzeware section included mainly French Baroque clocks and wall and table chandeliers. The collection of silverware was also extensive, with objects coming mainly from Germany. This section included objects such as Renaissance and Baroque goblets, coin cups and lidded tankards. The collection also included a number of fancy goods and small utensils. These included tins and flasks, pin boxes, cane handles, pet shafts and signet rings, miniatures, jewelry, fans, plaques and medals, keys and eating utensils. Also represented in the collection were various historical textiles such as fabrics, embroidery and works made of lace. The Reichenheims had also acquired works of glass, majolica, and faience. Another part of the collection was European porcelain, for example from the manufactories in Meissen, Ludwigsburg and the Royal Porcelain Manufactory in Berlin. In addition, there were Chinese handicrafts such as glazed pottery, porcelains and objects made of stone, glass and metal. Most of the pieces are no longer traceable today and are possibly in private collections.

Paintings and works on paper 
While in the catalog of the 1936 auction the collection of paintings and works on paper was only treated in passing, these works receive special attention in the present. On the one hand, this has to do with the considerable financial value of these works of art; on the other hand, Margarete Oppenheim was a pioneer as a collector of modern art. Her extensive Cézanne collection has remained unsurpassed in Germany to the present day, both privately and in museums. In addition, she was one of the first German collectors of the works of Vincent van Gogh. 

The two art historians Anna-Carolin Augustin and Sebastian Panwitz succeeded in reconstructing Margarete Oppenheim's collection.  as follows: El Greco's older art included a depiction of the Madonna and an Annunciation (whereabouts unknown in each case). In addition, there were the two Venice motifs Concert in the Doge's Palace and The Piazza San Marco by Francesco Guardi (whereabouts unknown in each case). French painting of the 19th century began in the Oppenheim Collection with three works by Édouard Manet. In addition to the painting Young Woman in the Garden (private collection), she owned the pastel painting Portrait of Countess Albazzi (Solomon R. Guggenheim Museum, New York City) and the watercolor Berthe Morisot à l'Eventail (Art Institute of Chicago). By Edgar Degas, the collection included A Woman Places a Vase of Flowers on the Table/Woman Arranging Flowers (whereabouts unknown). Works by Vincent van Gogh in the Oppenheim Collection included an unspecified boy's head (whereabouts unknown) and the paintings On the Banks of the Oise at Auvers (Detroit Institute of Arts), White Roses (Metropolitan Museum of Art, New York City), and Angle in the Park of the St. Paul Asylum (whereabouts unknown).Margarete Oppenheim's collection, however, was best known for the works of Paul Cezanne. These included the paintings Village and Sea at l'Estaque (Rosengart Collection, Lucerne), The Bent Tree (Hiroshima Museum of Art), In the Plain of Bellevue (Wallraf-Richartz-Museum & Fondation Corboud, Cologne) and Seven Bathers (Fondation Beyeler, Riehen), which are now in public collections. In addition, there is a landscape that has belonged to the collection of the Swedish National Museum since 1916. The following paintings are privately owned: Bathing Woman, House with Red Roof (Le jas de Bouffan), The Houses at Bellevue with Dovecote, Surroundings of Marseille/The Stagecoach and Surroundings of Gardanne. In the works Woman on a Blue Ground, House with Blue Shops and Houses, Reddish Water in the Foreground, the medium and whereabouts are unknown. By Cézanne, the collector also owned the watercolor Defoliated Trees (whereabouts unknown) and the watercolor pencil drawings La montagne Sainte-Victoire (privately owned), Forest Interior, and Forest Path (whereabouts unknown in each case). Other drawings in the collection were the motifs Trees, Tree and Bald Trees (whereabouts unknown in each case).

From the German-speaking world, Margarete Oppenheim acquired a painting version of Max Slevogt's Parrot Man from 1901 (private collection). Among her most recent acquisitions were the Expressionist paintings Toledo by Oskar Kokoschka from 1925 (Musée Jenisch, Fondation Oskar Kokoschka, Vevey) and Die Loge by Max Beckmann from 1928 (Staatsgalerie Stuttgart).

Claims for restitution for Nazi era forced sales 
in 2018 the Oppenheim heirs reached a settlement with the Staatliche Museen zu Berlin, resulting in the restitution of eleven objects of which five works were repurchased for the museums. These include a putto with panther made of Frankenthal porcelain from 1754 in the Museum of Decorative Arts and a statuette of the Virgin Mary made of spindle tree wood in Passau around 1520 in the Sculpture Collection in the Bode Museum.   They were located in the Kunstgewerbemuseum (Museum of Decorative Arts) and the Skulpturensammlung (Sculpture Collection) of the Staatliche Museen zu Berlin (National Museums in Berlin).  The GRASSI Museum für Angewandte Kunst in Leipzig, returned 25 objects to the Oppenheim heirs.

Object from the Reichenheim-Oppenheim collection are found in numerous museums. The Art Institute of Chicago holds a richly decorated silver salt vessel, made in the Netherlands around 1575-1600. The Metropolitan Museum of Art in New York City houses a landscape-painted porcelain cup and matching saucer from about 1730-1740 from the workshop of Charles Fromery and a silver reliquary pendant from the Rhineland of the late 14th century. A snuff box made of Meissen porcelain is now part of the collection of the Rijksmuseum in Amsterdam, and a lidded tankard with a pouring tube is in the Grassimuseum in Leipzig.

Research into the loss of the Oppenheim collection during the Nazi era continues.

Literature 

 Götz Adriani: Cézanne – Gemälde. DuMont, Köln 1993, .
 Anna-Carolin Augustin: Berliner Kunstmatronage: Sammlerinnen und Förderinnen bildender Kunst um 1900, Wallstein Verlag, Göttingen 2018, .
 Auktionshaus Julius Böhler (Hrsg.): Sammlung Frau Margarete Oppenheim. Ausstellung vom 23. April bis 15. Mai 1936 – täglich, mit Ausnahme der Sonntage – bei Julius Böhler. Versteigerung am 18., 19., 20., und – falls nötig – am 22. Mai 1936; München: Julius Böhler 1936.
 Cella-Margaretha Girardet: Jüdische Mäzene für die Preußischen Museen zu Berlin, eine Studie zum Mäzenatentum im Deutschen Kaiserreich und in der Weimarer Republik. Hänsel-Hohenhausen, Egelsbach 1997, .
 Johann Georg von Hohenzollern: Manet bis van Gogh: Hugo von Tschudi und der Kampf um die Moderne. Prestel, München 1996, .
 Bruno Jahn: Der Kaiser Friedrich Museumsverein (KFMV) und seine ehemaligen jüdischen Mitglieder/Mitglieder jüdischer Herkunft. Förderverein der Gemäldegalerie und Skulpturensammlung SMB e.V. seit 1897, Berlin 2018.
 Elke-Vera Kotowski (Hrsg.): Salondamen und Frauenzimmer, Selbstemanzipation deutsch-jüdischer Frauen in zwei Jahrhunderten. De Gruyter Oldenbourg, Berlin u. a. 2016, .
 Sebastian Panwitz: "... das Departement Kunst untersteht meiner Frau". Margarete Oppenheim und ihre Sammlung; in: Anna-Dorothea Ludewig u. a. (Hrsg.): Aufbruch in die Moderne: Sammler, Mäzene und Kunsthändler in Berlin 1880–1933. DuMont, Köln 2012, p. 120–135, .
 Auktionshaus Adolf Weinmüller (Hrsg.): Altes Kunstgewerbe aus der Sammlung Frau Margarete Oppenheim. – Orientteppiche, Textilien und Keramik eines westdeutschen Sammlers. – Asiatische Plastik eines sächsischen Sammlers. Auktionskatalog des Münchener Kunstversteigerungshauses Adolf Weinmüller für die Versteigerung am 2. und 3. Dezember 1936.

External links 

 Kurzbiografie Margarete Oppenheim auf der Internetseite des British Museum (englisch)
 Oppenheim, Margarete (geb. Eisner, verw. Reichenheim) auf der Website der Koordinierungsstelle für Kulturgutverluste Lost Art

References 

1857 births
1935 deaths
German art collectors
Jewish art collectors